Keith Barker (born February 11, 1959) is a sailor who competed for the British Virgin Islands. Barker with his older brother Peter Barker competed at the 1984 Summer Olympics in Los Angeles, they entered the 470 class and out of 28 crews they finished 25th.

References

Olympic sailors of the British Virgin Islands
British Virgin Islands male sailors (sport)
Sailors at the 1984 Summer Olympics – 470
Living people
1959 births